James Mpanza (1889–1970) was a squatter camp leader in Johannesburg, South Africa from the mid-1940s until the late 1960s. In 1944 he led the land invasion that resulted in the founding of modern Soweto. Mpanza is known as 'the father of Soweto'.

Life
Mpanza was born on 15 May 1889 in Georgedale, today part of Cato Ridge. His father Ventile Mbihlana Mpanza, an ox cart driver, and his wife Evelyn had four children but their eldest son died before manhood. Mpanza studied until year 6 at Georgedale Primary School before qualifying with a third class teaching certificate at Indaleni in Natal. 
He was a clerk and interpreter at a solicitors office when he was eighteen, he was falsely convicted of fraud in 1912. He came to notice when he was accused of  murder in 1915 of an Indian shopkeeper called Adam. He appealed his own case arguing that he was somewhere else at the time. He was reprieved but he still had a life sentence. He served thirteen years in jail moving from place to place as he misbehaved and attacked warders. At Cinderella prison in Boksburg at the end of World War One he became a Christian and wrote a short book on his ideas and began preaching to his fellow prisoners.

In 1927 he was released and he made his living by teaching in Pretoria before he moved to Orlando, Johannesburg in 1934. He would ride a horse through Orlando giving rise to an air of eccentricity. In 1937, he formed the Orlando Boys' Club, which was renamed Orlando Pirates Football Club in 1939. He would send a proposal in 1958 to the City of Johannesburg for a stadium in Orlando which resulted in the construction of Orlando Stadium in 1959.

He held public meetings at his home in Orlando, which is now commemorated as James Mpanza House. In April 1944, despite being seen as controversial, he persuaded 8,000 people to follow him from Orlando to create a new township called Sofasonke Township with himself as unofficial mayor. By 1946 there were 20,000 people squatting there and Mpanza charged a fee to join the camp and to claim a site and then there was a fee of two shillings and sixpence every week. In return the squatters had their own police force. Mpanza operated informal courts at his Orlando home where family disputes could be settled. Conditions however were poor and there was no health service. The death of Mpanza's son, Dumisani, was put down to poor medical care. The squatters had left the slums of Orlando but their plight will still not certain and Mpanza got the nickname of "Sofasonke" ("we shall all die") as he added his opinion of their outlook if they had no help. It was this rhetoric that got him the nickname but it also encouraged the funding necessary to convert this shantytown into the town of SOuth WEstern TOwnships" or Soweto. It was not just rhetoric however as he used his loyal following to create supportive candidates for the Orlando Advisory Board.

Mpanza successfully appealed against a government deportation order that would have exiled him in Natal. This allowed him to continue to influence the Orlando Advisory Board. He later helped to set up the Soweto Urban Banto Council in the 1960s which reduced his importance.

Mpanza was interested in horse racing and owned his own racehorses in the Orange Free State and in the Transvaal, but because of the laws at the time he had to hire white jockeys to race them.

Legacy
Mpanza died in 1970 at his home in Orlando East and he was given a large civic funeral and buried in Jabulani, Soweto Doornkop cemetery. Mpanza's Sofasonke Party still thrived and in 1971 it supplied the majority of the council. Twenty years later it was still a force in South African politics. The "traditional courts" or makgotla that operated informally in Soweto are thought to have come from the "parents courts" that Mpanza operated at his own house.

The James Mpanza House where his family lived after his death was given a blue plaque to mark his contribution to the history of South Africa.

References

Further reading

Bonner, P. 'The Politics of Black Squatter Movements on the Rand, 1944–1952, Radical History Review, 1990
Gerhart G.M and Karis T. (ed). From Protest to challenge: A documentary History of African Politics in South Africa: 1882–1964, Vol.4 Political Profiles 1882 – 1964. Hoover Institution Press: Stanford University, 1977
Stadler, A. 'Birds in the Cornfield: Squatter movements in Johannesburg, 1944–1947', Journal of Southern African Studies, 1979

1889 births
1970 deaths
South African activists
Zulu people
Shack dwellers
20th-century squatters
Squatter leaders
History of Johannesburg
Housing in South Africa